Helga Klein (Germany, 15 August 1931 – Germany, 27 January 2021) was a German athlete who competed mainly in the 100 metres. She competed for West Germany in the 1952 Summer Olympics held in Helsinki, Finland in the 4 x 100 metres where she won the Silver medal with her teammates Ursula Knab, Maria Sander and Marga Petersen.

References

External links
 Sports reference

1931 births
2021 deaths
West German female sprinters
Olympic athletes of West Germany
Athletes (track and field) at the 1952 Summer Olympics
Olympic silver medalists for Germany
Medalists at the 1952 Summer Olympics
Olympic silver medalists in athletics (track and field)
Olympic female sprinters